Luc Luycx (born 11 April 1958) is the designer of the common side of the euro coins.

Luycx is a computer engineer and medallist. He was born in Aalst, Belgium and now lives in Dendermonde. Luycx worked for the Royal Belgian Mint. He designed the euro coins in 1996. His signature on all euro coins is visible as two L letters connected together (LL). On the 2-euro coin, this is visible under the O of the word EURO on the common side.

See also
 Euro
 Robert Kalina

References

External links
 Embassy of Belgium in London - About the Euro Coins

1958 births
Living people
People from Aalst, Belgium
Coin designers
Flemish designers